"Material Girl" is a song recorded by American singer Madonna for her second studio album, Like a Virgin (1984). It was released on January 23, 1985, by the Sire label as the second single from Like a Virgin. It also appears slightly remixed on the 1990 greatest hits compilation, The Immaculate Collection, and in its original form on the 2009 greatest hits compilation, Celebration. The song was written by Peter Brown and Robert Rans, while Nile Rodgers produced the track. Madonna explained that the concept of the song was indicative of her life at that time, and she liked it because she felt it was provocative.

"Material Girl" consists of synth arrangements with a robotic-sounding voice chant repeating the hook, "living in a material world". The lyrics identify with materialism, with Madonna asking for a rich and affluent life, and only wanting to date men who can offer her this. Contemporary critics have frequently identified "Material Girl" along with "Like a Virgin" as the songs that established Madonna as an icon. "Material Girl" was a commercial success, reaching the top-five in Australia, Belgium, Canada, Ireland, Japan and United Kingdom. It reached the number two position on the Billboard Hot 100 in the United States, becoming her third top-five single there.

The music video was a mimicry of Marilyn Monroe's performance of the song "Diamonds Are a Girl's Best Friend" from the 1953 film Gentlemen Prefer Blondes. The mimicked scenes are interspersed with scenes of a Hollywood director trying to win the heart of an actress, played by Madonna herself. Discovering that, contrary to her song, the young woman was not impressed by money and expensive gifts, he pretended to be penniless and succeeded in taking her out on a date. She has performed the song in five of her world tours; most of her performances of the song on tour are mimicries of the song's music video.

"Material Girl" has been covered by a number of artists, including Britney Spears and Hilary and Haylie Duff. It also became a viral hit on TikTok. Madonna has often remarked that she regrets recording "Material Girl" as its title became a nickname for her in the mainstream media. The song has been labeled an empowering influence for women, and was the subject of debates.

Background
"Material Girl" was written by Peter Brown and Robert Rans, while Nile Rodgers produced the track. In 1986, Madonna told Company magazine, that although she did not write or create the song, the lyrical meaning and concept did apply to her situation at that point of time. She elaborated, "I'm very career-oriented. You are attracted to people who are ambitious that way, too, like in the song 'Material Girl'. You are attracted to men who have material things because that's what pays the rents and buys you furs. That's the security. That lasts longer than emotions." During a 2009 interview with Rolling Stone, Madonna was asked by interviewer Austin Scaggs, regarding her first feelings, after listening to the demos of "Like a Virgin" and "Material Girl". Madonna responded by saying, "I liked them both because they were ironic and provocative at the same time but also unlike me. I am not a materialistic person, and I certainly wasn't a virgin, and, by the way, how can you be like a virgin? I liked the play on words, I thought they were clever. They're so geeky, they're cool."

Composition

"Material Girl" consists of synth arrangements, with a strong backbeat supporting it. A robotic-sounding male voice, sung by Frank Simms, repeats the hook "Living in a material world". According to the sheet music published at Musicnotes.com by Alfred Publishing, the song is set in the time signature of common time, with a tempo of 120 beats per minute. It is set in the key of C major, with Madonna's voice spanning from the tonal nodes of C4 to C5. The song has a basic chord progression of F–G–Em–Am-F-G-C in the chorus, while the verses are based on the C mixolydian mode, giving a hip, swing-like mood. The bassline in the song with the post-disco origins is reminiscent of the Jacksons' "Can You Feel It", which appeared on their 1980 album Triumph. Furthermore, the strophes remind of the refrain from Melissa Manchester's hit "You Should Hear How She Talks About You" (1982).

The lyrics explain that Madonna is a "material girl" who will not accept men who cannot provide her with luxuries.

Critical reception
Following the song's release on November 30, 1984, as the second single from Like a Virgin, "Material Girl" received mixed reviews from music critics. Author Rikky Rooksby, in his book The Complete Guide to the Music of Madonna, compared the song with those of Cyndi Lauper because of Madonna's shrill voice in the song. He added that the song was a "pungent satire on the Reagan/Thatcher young-guns-go-for-it era. Which just goes to show that pop music and irony don't mix." Stephen Thomas Erlewine from AllMusic said that "Material Girl" was one of the songs that made Madonna an icon, the other being "Like a Virgin" from the same album, both remaining as a definitive statement. He added that both tunes overshadow the rest of the record, "because they are a perfect match of theme and sound." Debby Miller from Rolling Stone, felt that the song portrayed Madonna as a more practical girl than previous female singers. Dave Karger from Entertainment Weekly, while reviewing the album in 1995, felt that the song came off a bit repetitious and immature when compared to the present context. Jim Farber from the same publication felt that the song provided then critics a way to criticize Madonna's work. Sal Cinquemani of Slant Magazine commented that Madonna had "defined a generation with hits like 'Material Girl'." Alfred Soto from Stylus Magazine compared the song with "Everything She Wants" by Wham!. Michael Paoletta from Billboard commented that the song sustained a "fevered dance-rock momentum." Nancy Erlick from Billboard said that "singer and team conquer once more with their irresistible assembly of new and used pop hooks." Cashbox said that the song is "a playful follow-up to 'Like A Virgin'" which "still emphasizes a danceable backbeat, but...has a sense of humor and Madonna doesn't sound quite as squeaky as on past cuts."  In 2003, Madonna fans were asked to vote for their Top 20 Madonna singles of all time for a special issue of Q magazine dedicated to Madonna. "Material Girl" was allocated the 15th spot on the list.

Chart performance
The song debuted on the Billboard Hot 100 during the week of February 9, 1985, at position 43, when "Like a Virgin" was descending out of the top ten. The single climbed the Hot 100 quickly, jumping 13 spots to number five the week of March 9, 1985, and eventually spent two weeks at number two, held off by REO Speedwagon's "Can't Fight This Feeling" and Phil Collins' "One More Night". The week when the song slipped to position three, her upcoming single "Crazy for You" reached number four, giving Madonna two simultaneous top-five hits. "Material Girl" reached the top of the Hot Dance Club Songs but was less successful on the Hot R&B/Hip-Hop Songs chart, failing to enter the top 40 and peaking at number 49. It was placed at number 58 on the year-end chart for 1985, with Madonna becoming the top pop artist for the year. In Canada, the song debuted on the RPM Singles Chart at number 76, on the issue dated February 16, 1985. After five weeks, it reached a peak position of four on the chart and was present on the chart for a total of 21 weeks. It was ranked at number 46 on the RPM Year-End chart for 1985.

In the United Kingdom, "Material Girl" debuted on the UK Singles Chart at number 24 on March 2, 1985, and reached a peak position of number three. It was present for a total of ten weeks on the chart. The song was certified gold by the British Phonographic Industry, for sales and streams exceeding 400,000 units. According to the Official Charts Company, the song has sold 405,000 copies there. Across Europe, the song reached the top-ten in Austria, Belgium, Ireland, Netherlands, Spain and the Eurochart Hot 100 Singles, while reaching the top 40 of Germany, Italy and Switzerland.

In Australia, the single debuted at number 25 on 17 March 1985 and peaked at number four three weeks later. It also reached the Top 5 in New Zealand and Japan.

Music video

The music video was inspired by Madonna's admiration of Marilyn Monroe and mimicked the latter's performance of the song "Diamonds Are a Girl's Best Friend" from the 1953 film Gentlemen Prefer Blondes. The video was developed to simultaneously be an exegesis and a critique of the lyrics and Madonna herself. It was the first time Madonna was able to showcase her acting ability to the public, combining the dance routines of "Diamonds Are a Girl's Best Friend" with the storyline of a man who impresses Madonna with daisies, rather than diamonds. In a 1987 interview with New York Daily News, Madonna said:
Well, my favorite scene in all of Monroe's movies is when she does that dance sequence for 'Diamonds Are a Girl's Best Friend'. And when it came time to do the video for the song [Material Girl], I said, I can just redo that whole scene and it will be perfect. [...] Marilyn was made into something not human in a way, and I can relate to that. Her sexuality was something everyone was obsessed with and that I can relate to. And there were certain things about her vulnerability that I'm curious about and attracted to.

The music video was shot January 10 and 11, 1985, at Ren-Mar Studios in Hollywood, California, and was directed by Mary Lambert; Lambert had previously directed the videos for "Borderline" and "Like a Virgin".  It was produced by Simon Fields with principal photography by Peter Sinclair, editing by Glenn Morgan and choreography by Kenny Ortega. Much of the jewelry is from the collection of Connie Parente, a popular Hollywood jewelry collector.

The video featured actor Keith Carradine as Madonna's wealthy love interest. According to Carradine, Madonna had asked for him to appear in the video. Actor Robert Wuhl appeared in the video's opening sequence as George, an employee of Carradine's character. It was on the set of the video that Madonna met actor Sean Penn, whom she began a relationship with and married eight months later.

The video opens with two men (Carradine) watching a rush in the screening rooms of a Hollywood studio. On the screen, an actress played by Madonna sings and dances to "Material Girl", dressed like Monroe from "Diamonds Are a Girl's Best Friend". One of the men, played by Carradine, is a director or a producer and is immensely rich. He falls in love with the actress and wants to express his passion for her. He tells his employee, played by Wuhl: "She's [Madonna] fantastic. She could become a star." The employee answered: "She could be. She could be great. She could be a major star." The former then concludes by saying: "She is a star, George." Madonna is in a pink strapless gown and has her hair in blond locks ala Monroe. The background is a reconstruction of the Monroe video, complete with staircase, chandeliers and a number of tuxedo clad chorus boys. Madonna dances and sings the song, while she is showered with cash, expensive jewelry, furs and is carried by the men over the stairs. At one time, she eludes herself from the men, by dismissing them with her fan. As the producer tries to impress Madonna, he comes to learn she is not impressed by material items, rather preferring simple romance. He pretends to be penniless, and brings her hand-cut flowers while paying a poor man a large amount to borrow (or possibly buy) his dirty truck to take her on a date. His plan seems to work, because the final scene shows him and Madonna kissing in an intimate position.

It was in the video of "Material Girl" that Madonna began to accept and utilize herself being compared to Monroe. However, she established a safe distance from those comparisons and developed inside the same pastiche. Details like the usage of different gloves or different fans in the video brought forth the connections between these women, but Madonna alluded to herself in subtle ways. The fan in Monroe's hand for the original video was an iconography of the Sudarshana Chakra (wheel) held by the Indian idol Vishnu. Scholar Georges-Claude Guilbert, who wrote Madonna as postmodern myth: how one star's self-construction rewrites sex, said that the fan symbolized fiery desire aroused by Monroe as well as ritual sacrifice, eerily foreshadowing her untimely death in 1962. Madonna's fan, which appeared at the end of the video, signified that Madonna – while paying her tribute to Monroe – was signaling that she had no intention of being a victim like her, and that she was on the path of becoming a feminist post-modern myth. Author Nicholas Cook commented that the video promoted Madonna's identity as the song suggested, with the purpose of shifting "Madonna's image from that of a disco-bimbo to authentic star." Lisa A. Lewis, author of Gender, Politics and MTV said that with the video, Madonna achieved the rare distinction of being accepted as a literature medium by the music authors. "Material Girl" was nominated for best female video at the 1985 MTV Video Music Awards, but lost to Tina Turner's "What's Love Got to Do with It". The video was ranked at position 54 on VH1's 100 Greatest Videos. On YouTube, the video became her ninth video to surpass 100 million views.

Live performances

"Material Girl" was performed by Madonna on five of her world tours. She ended the Virgin Tour (1985) with a self-parodying performance of the song. She wore a white tube top and a tight white skirt and carried a bunch of notes in her left hand. At the end of the performance she asked the audience "Do you really think I'm a material girl?...I'm not...Take it [Throwing fake money]... I don't need money... I need love." As she began to strip off more clothes, she was apprehended and marched offstage by an extra posing as her father. In Detroit, her father Tony himself did the honors. The performance was included in the VHS release Madonna Live: The Virgin Tour.

In the Who's That Girl World Tour of 1987, Madonna performed it as a medley with "Dress You Up" and "Like a Virgin". She wore an elaborate costume, inspired by Dame Edna Everage. It consisted of a hat strewn with fake fruits, flowers and feathers, jeweled batwing spectacles with heavy, black frames, a ruffled skirt, a bodice covered with objects like watches and dolls and fishnets. Author Carol Clrek stated that the dress was more "ludicrous for Madonna, than humorous." Two different performances of the song on this tour can be found on the videos: Who's That Girl: Live in Japan, filmed in Tokyo, Japan, on June 22, 1987, and Ciao Italia: Live from Italy, filmed in Turin, Italy, on September 4, 1987.

For the Blond Ambition World Tour in 1990, Madonna and her supporting dancers Niki Haris and Donna De Lory were dressed as old women in fluffy dressing gowns with dollar signs and curling pins in their hair. Singing the song with a strong mid-western accent, they got up and revealed a frivolish pink dress underneath their gown, in which they danced around. On some dates Madonna replaced the words "experience has made me rich" with "experience has made me a bitch". After singing, she produced dollar bills out of her corsage and threw them up in the air for the audience to catch. Two different performances were taped and released on video, Blond Ambition: Japan Tour 90, taped in Yokohama, Japan, on April 27, 1990, and Blond Ambition World Tour Live, taped in Nice, France, on August 5, 1990. During the Re-Invention World Tour of 2004, a general setlist was decided where the show rehearsals would start with "I'm So Stupid" from American Life, "Dress You Up" and "Material Girl". But "Dress You Up" and "I'm So Stupid" were later dropped from the show. Hence "Material Girl" was transferred as the closing song of the military segment of the show, and was re-arranged as an electric guitar version. Madonna wore military themed clothes and sang the song while standing in front of a microphone and playing an electric guitar. The backdrops displayed mathematical equations along with DNA helixes rushing through the screens.

Minimal elements of the song were included in the live performance of "Girl Gone Wild" on the MDNA Tour (2012). "Material Girl" was included in the final section of the Rebel Heart Tour (2015–16). For this section, Madonna worked with designer Jeremy Scott for party inspired costumes. She wanted a "Harlem-flapper-meets-Paris-in-the-Twenties" look, and Scott came up with the final dress adorned with thousands of Swarovski crystals. Following the jazz rendition of 2000 single "Music", Madonna's started performing "Material Girl", in a similar theme like the music video. Towards the end, Madonna changed the choreography, and made her dancers who posed as suitors, to fall down the stairs instead. The performance ended with the singer walking down the catwalk in a bridal veil and carrying a white bouquet, which she eventually throws into the crowd. Utilizing the stage as both stairs as well as video backdrop, the stairs rose up and down during the song. The performance of the song at the March 19–20, 2016 shows in Sydney's Allphones Arena was recorded and released in Madonna's fifth live album, Rebel Heart Tour.

In June 2022, to accompany the remix album release, Finally Enough Love: 50 Number Ones Madonna performed at Pride at the Women of the World Party in New York City. Madonna performed a mashup of "Material Girl" with Saucy Santana's hip hop song "Material Girl".

Legacy

After the song's release, the phrase "material girl" became another nickname for Madonna. She often remarked that "Material Girl" is the song she most regrets recording, as it became a label that has been attached to her for decades. She also said if she had known this, she probably would never have recorded it. After making the video, Madonna said she never wanted to be compared to Monroe, despite posing as the Hollywood icon and recreating many of Marilyn's signature poses for various photos shoots, most notably a 1991 issue of Vanity Fair. Reflecting on the song, Madonna told author J. Randy Taraborrelli:

Academics analyzed the usage of the term material as odd because, according to them, materialistic is the correct word. However, that would have posed problems of versification for Madonna and songwriter Brown. Guilbert commented that "material girl" designated a certain type of liberated women, thus deviating from its original coinage which meant a girl who is tangible and accessible. Cook said that the meaning and impact of "material girl" was no longer circumscribed by the video, rather by its lyrics. Its influence was seen later among such diverse groups such as female versus male, gay versus straight, and academic versus teenage.

In 1993, a conference was held at the University of California, Santa Barbara, with the subject as Madonna: Feminist Icon or Material Girl?. The conference pondered on the duality of Madonna as both of them and deduced that the question of Madonna's feminism is not easy to decide. Some of the feminists left the conference, citing that they had not been able to make up their minds. As New Age spirituality became popular in the U.S. in the late 1990s, Madonna tried to shun the "material girl" tag, and embarked on a spiritual quest of her own. Journals like The Times and The Advocate declared her as "the Ethereal Girl" and "Spiritual Girl" respectively.

"Material Gworrllllllll!"

In 2022, Madonna released a collaboration with American rapper Saucy Santana, titled "Material Gworrllllllll!". The song is a remix of Saucy Santana's 2019 single, “Material Girl”. "Material Gworrllllllll!" is a pop rap, bounce and electropop track with elements of Miami bass and trap.

Track listing
 US and UK 7-inch single
 "Material Girl" – 4:00
 "Pretender" – 4:28

US and UK 12-inch single; reissue CD single (1995)
 "Material Girl" (extended dance mix) – 6:05
 "Pretender" – 4:28

 Japanese 12-inch single; reissue CD single
 "Material Girl" (extended dance mix) – 6:10
 "Into the Groove" – 4:45
 "Angel" (extended dance mix) – 6:14

Credits and personnel
Credits are adapted from the album and 12-inch maxi-single liner notes.
 Madonna – vocals, background vocals
 Peter Brown – writer
 Robert Rans – writer
 Nile Rodgers – producer, guitar, Synclavier II, Juno-60
 Nathaniel S. Hardy, Jr. - Keyboards 
 Bernard Edwards – bass
 Tony Thompson – drums
 Curtis King – background vocals
 Frank Simms – background vocals
 George Simms – background vocals
 Jeri McManus - art design
 Victoria Pearson - photography
 Steven Meisel - photography

Charts

Weekly charts

"Material Gworrllllllll!"

Year-end charts

Certification and sales

See also
 List of number-one dance singles of 1985 (U.S.)
 List of Cash Box Top 100 number-one singles of 1985

References

Bibliography

External links
 

Songs about consumerism
1984 songs
1984 singles
Cashbox number-one singles
Haylie Duff songs
Hilary Duff songs
KMFDM songs
Madonna songs
Satirical songs
Sire Records singles
Song recordings produced by Nile Rodgers
Song recordings produced by the Dead Executives
Songs written by Peter Brown (singer)
Warner Records singles